Bret Emanuel Lockett (born October 7, 1986) is a former NFL American football safety. He was signed by the Cleveland Browns as an undrafted free agent in 2009. He was picked up off waivers to the New England Patriots in 2009 and spent three years on the team. He signed to the New York Jets in 2013. Lockett played college football at UCLA.

Early years
Lockett attended Diamond Bar High School in Diamond Bar, California, where he was a three-year starter in football as a safety, linebacker, and wide receiver. As a receiver in 2004, he was a first-team All-Sierra League selection. He also lettered in track and field in 2003.

College career
After graduating from high school, Lockett attended the University of California, Los Angeles beginning in 2005. He appeared in 12 games as a freshman, contributing on special teams. He saw more time in defense in 2006, recording seven tackles in 13 games played. He made his first start in his junior year in 2007, and totaled 12 tackles over 12 games. In his senior season in 2008, Lockett started 11 games, recording 61 tackles.

Professional career

Cleveland Browns
Lockett was signed as an undrafted free agent by the Cleveland Browns following the 2009 NFL Draft. He was waived by the Browns during final cuts on September 6, 2009.

New England Patriots
Lockett was claimed off waivers by the New England Patriots on September 7, 2009. He was placed on injured reserve on December 9. He finished the 2009 season with seven tackles over 10 games. Following the season, Lockett was an exclusive-rights free agent before re-signing with the Patriots. He was placed on injured reserve on August 31, 2010, with a chest injury.

He was waived/injured during training camp in 2011. Lockett is expected to miss the 2011 season after tearing his groin in preseason game against the Bucs.

New York Jets
Lockett was signed by the New York Jets to a reserve/future contract on January 2, 2013. He was released on August 26, 2013.

References

External links
New York Jets bio
New England Patriots bio
UCLA Bruins bio

1986 births
Living people
People from San Dimas, California
Players of American football from Los Angeles
American football safeties
UCLA Bruins football players
Cleveland Browns players
New England Patriots players
New York Jets players
People from Diamond Bar, California